Surf and turf or surf 'n' turf is a main course combining seafood and red meat. A typical seafood component would be lobster (either lobster tail or a whole lobster), prawns, shrimp, squid or scallops,  any of which could be steamed, grilled or breaded and fried.  The meat is typically beef steak, although others may be used. One standard combination is lobster tail and filet mignon.

Surf and turf is typically served in steakhouses in the United States, Canada, United Kingdom, and Australia.

Surf and turf is sometimes referred to as Reef and beef or Reef 'n' Beef in Australia.

Etymology
It is unclear where the term originated. The earliest known citation is from 1961, in the Los Angeles Times.

History
In late 19th-century America, combining large portions of lobster and steak was popular at "show restaurants known as lobster palaces," favored by nouveau riche "arrivistes." This became unfashionable by the 1920s and only regained popularity in the early 1960s.

Surf 'n' turf was featured in 1962 at the Eye of the Needle, a revolving restaurant atop the Space Needle in Seattle, Washington.

Surf and turf is often considered to symbolize the middle-class "Continental cuisine" of the 1960s and 1970s, with (frozen) lobster and steak as replacements for the middle class.

Variations
A variation is the surf and turf burger, which is prepared with ground beef and various types of seafood, such as lobster, shrimp, or crab.

Reputation
Surf and turf is often considered as an example of conspicuous consumption and kitsch, as it combines two expensive foods which are not normally considered to be complementary:

See also

 Fish and chips
 List of meat dishes
 List of seafood dishes
 List of steak dishes

References

External links
 

Seafood dishes
Food combinations
Beef steak dishes